Suzhuang Township is a township under the administration of Qinshui County, Shanxi, China. , it has five villages under its administration:
Suzhuang Village
Gudui Village
Guanting Village
Dongjiashan Village
Dangchuzhuang Village

References 

Township-level divisions of Shanxi
Qinshui County